Roman Holiday is a 1931 novel by Upton Sinclair.

External links
Roman Holiday, available at Internet Archive

1931 American novels
Novels by Upton Sinclair
Novels set in Rome